was a Japanese travel writer and visual producer. He became a travel writer after his activity as an illustrator and reporter.

Early life
Toi was born in Shinjuku, Tokyo on 12 October 1948. His father was Shozo Toi, who was the first researcher of the Chichibu Incident.

Career
Reporting on the Bōsōzoku in Japan led him to get a motorcycle driver's licence at the age of 32, and begin motorcycling abroad. He covered more than 250,000 kilometers, more than 50 countries and across five continents.
He has also visited Hiroo Onoda's farm in Brazil, to report on the former Japanese army intelligence officer trained by the Nakano School who was stationed on Lubang Island in the Philippines.
He has the most entries to off-road race Baja 1000, held in Baja California, Mexico, as Japanese. He had the plan to motorcycle the entire course of five continents.

Illness and death
Toi was diagnosed with lung cancer. He died of the illness on July 28, 2013 in Japan, aged 64. His funeral took place on July 29, one day after his death, and was attended by close relatives.

Books

Fiction

Nonfiction

References

External links

Japanese male short story writers
1948 births
Japanese writers
2013 deaths
People from Shinjuku
Writers from Tokyo
Deaths from lung cancer in Japan
Motorcycling writers